The Essential Mariah Carey is the third greatest hits album by American singer and songwriter Mariah Carey. The album was released in June 2011 in the U.K. and Ireland as a repackage of her previous album Greatest Hits. In the U.S., it was released on May 9, 2012, as an entirely new greatest hits album as part of Sony's The Essential series, and contains songs released during Mariah's time at Columbia Records. It replaces some songs (featured on the original 2001 Greatest Hits release) with their extended club mixes, and others being completely removed in favor of tracks that had not been released as singles. Much of the artwork inside the album booklet is very similar to that of the Greatest Hits release.

Track listing

UK and Ireland edition

US edition

Charts

Weekly charts

Year-end charts

Release history

References

Mariah Carey compilation albums
2011 greatest hits albums
Albums produced by Ric Wake
Albums produced by Walter Afanasieff
Albums produced by Jermaine Dupri
Columbia Records compilation albums